Akademski vaterpolski klub Branik Maribor or simply Branik is a water polo club from Maribor, Slovenia. AVK Branik competes in the Slovenian Championship and the Alpe Waterpolo League. The club was founded in 1992 and play their home matches at Kopališče Pristan.

Honours
Slovenian Championship
Winners: 2013–14
Slovenian Cup
Winners: 2013–14

References

Sports clubs established in 1992
Water polo clubs in Slovenia
Sport in Maribor
1992 establishments in Slovenia